Ahyeon station, also Chugye University for the Arts station, is a subway station on Line 2 of the Seoul Metropolitan Subway. The station's name means "small hill between two larger hills".

Station layout

References

Seoul Metropolitan Subway stations
Railway stations opened in 1984
Metro stations in Mapo District
Metro stations in Seodaemun District
1984 establishments in South Korea
Chugye University for the Arts
20th-century architecture in South Korea